The 12297 /12298 Pune–Ahmedabad Duronto Express is an Express train of Indian Railways Duronto Express class that connects  (PUNE) to  (ADI).

It operates as train number 12297 from Ahmedabad Junction to Pune Junction and as train number 12298 in the reverse direction.

Coach composition

The rake has nine AC 3-tier coaches, three AC 2-tier coaches, one AC First Class, and two EOG cars, making a total of fifteen coaches. It does not have a pantry car coach.

As with most train services in India, coach composition may be amended at the discretion of Indian Railways, depending on the demand.

Train details

This train had its inaugural run on 11 March 2012 and it runs with new Duronto rakes.

See also

Ahimsa Express
Ahmedabad Junction railway station
Duronto Express
Pune Junction railway station

References 

 http://epaper.timesofindia.com/Default/Scripting/ArticleWin.asp?From=Search&Key=TOIA/2012/09/01/3/Ar00303.xml&CollName=TOI_AHMEDABAD_ARCHIVE_2009&DOCID=485955&Keyword=%28%3Cmany%3E%3Cstem%3Eduronto%29&skin=pastissues2&AppName=2&ViewMode=HTML
 http://epaper.timesofindia.com/Default/Scripting/ArticleWin.asp?From=Search&Key=TOIPU/2013/09/16/4/Ar00404.xml&CollName=TOI_PUNE_ARCHIVE_2009&DOCID=660205&Keyword=%28%3Cmany%3E%3Cstem%3Eduronto%29&skin=pastissues2&AppName=2&ViewMode=HTML
 http://epaper.timesofindia.com/Default/Scripting/ArticleWin.asp?From=Search&Key=TOIPU/2012/03/16/4/Ar00403.xml&CollName=TOI_PUNE_ARCHIVE_2009&DOCID=451137&Keyword=%28%3Cmany%3E%3Cstem%3Eduronto%29&skin=pastissues2&AppName=2&ViewMode=HTML
 http://epaper.timesofindia.com/Default/Scripting/ArticleWin.asp?From=Search&Key=TOIPU/2012/03/12/3/Ar00302.xml&CollName=TOI_PUNE_ARCHIVE_2009&DOCID=449731&Keyword=%28%3Cmany%3E%3Cstem%3Eduronto%29&skin=pastissues2&AppName=2&ViewMode=HTML
 http://epaper.timesofindia.com/Default/Scripting/ArticleWin.asp?From=Search&Key=TOIPU/2012/03/09/3/Ar00302.xml&CollName=TOI_PUNE_ARCHIVE_2009&DOCID=448613&Keyword=%28%3Cmany%3E%3Cstem%3Eduronto%29&skin=pastissues2&AppName=2&ViewMode=HTML
 http://epaper.timesofindia.com/Default/Scripting/ArticleWin.asp?From=Search&Key=TOIPU/2012/03/09/3/Ar00302.xml&CollName=TOI_PUNE_ARCHIVE_2009&DOCID=448613&Keyword=%28%3Cmany%3E%3Cstem%3Eduronto%29&skin=pastissues2&AppName=2&ViewMode=HTML

External links
  INDIANRAILINFO
  IRCTC
  IRFCA

Duronto Express trains
2012 establishments in Gujarat
Transport in Ahmedabad
Transport in Pune
Rail transport in Maharashtra
Rail transport in Gujarat
2012 establishments in Maharashtra